Hendrik Albert Schultens (25 February 1749 – 12 August 1793) was a third generation Dutch linguist.

Life
Shultens was born in Herborn. He was the son of Jan Jacob Schultens, orientalist and professor at Leiden University and  Suzanna Amalia Schramm, and was the grandson of Albert Schultens. 
Schultens studied orientalism in Leiden. 
He traveled to England and studied at Wadham College, Oxford, where he became Magister Artium, honoris causa, in 1773. 
He became professor in Eastern languages, first in Amsterdam, and then in Leiden. 
He married Catharina Elisabeth de Sitter.

Schultens published a translation (to Latin) and edition of Persian scholar Al-Zamakhshari, "Anthologia sententiarum Arabicarum: Cum scholiis Zamachsjarii" (1772). He was also the author of an edition of ancient Eastern fables, "Pars versionis arabicae libri Colailah wa Dimnah, sive Fabularum Bidpai philosophi Indi" (1786).

He died in Leiden in 1793.

References and external links

Attribution

1749 births
1793 deaths
Linguists from the Netherlands
Dutch orientalists
People from Leiden
Leiden University alumni
Alumni of Wadham College, Oxford
Academic staff of Leiden University
Academic staff of the University of Amsterdam
People from Lahn-Dill-Kreis